Mabel Jones (c. 1865–1923) was a British physician and a sympathizer to the Women's Social and Political Union (WSPU).

Medical career 
Trained in London and from 1898, she worked in a practice with her fellow student, Dr Helen Boyle in Brighton after moving from Hull and then moved on to Glasgow in 1908. Although Dr Jones initially handled the routine cases in Hove, Brighton, the clinic was focused in treating women and it was mostly female led.

Jones  was  also noted for helping others who were sympathetic to the cause."Dr. Mabel Jones did very well in helping the boys to get over their little colds and fevers. ... illustrate how genuine a feminist Paschal had become between two ardent suffragists, his wife and mother, he too called on Dr. Mabel Jones' services"

Queen Elisabeth Medal (Belgium) 
It is reported that Jones either worked in Belgium or attended Belgian wounded in Scotland during World War I  and was awarded the Queen Elisabeth Medal   and this was sent on her sudden death to her medical colleague Dr Helen Boyle of Brighton

Frances Gordon's case 
Jones evaluated the health state of suffragette Frances Gordon after she was released from Perth prison. A part of the report she produced was quoted in a letter to the Glasgow Evening Times:"I saw her (Miss Gordon) at Midnight in July 3. Her appearance was appalling, like a famine victim: the skin brown, her face bones standing out, her eyes half shut, her voice a whisper, her hands quite cold, her pulse a thread."This quote  and the Press exposure of pictures of women on stretchers after release from prisons led to questions in the House of Commons, giving voice to the female suffrage cause. In the book Martyrs in our Mydst, Leah Leneman openly questions the level of accuracy of Dr Jones report on Frances Gordon and also challenges the official version:"Comparing the [prison] medical officer's daily reports with Frances Gordon's story as related by Mabel Jones, it is clear that the later did indeed contained a good deal of distortion, but a far greater distortion was the version of the events provided by the medical officer and Chairman of the Prison Commission to the Scottish Office"

Supporting other suffragettes 
It is uncertain if Jones went to London to meet the Pankhursts to protest that Janie Allan was removed from the West of Scotland branch of the WSPU. The Women's Library Archive has a printed leaflet of a visit by Dr Jones to Mrs Pankhurst in a cell at the Central Police Station. She did  also co-examine the gynaecological damage done by the violent use of rectal feeding on Fanny Parker  and reported in the WSPU newsletters about other cases.

Death and legacy 
Jones died in 1923 after falling from a train in Northampton, England.

See also 
Women's suffrage in the United Kingdom

References 

Scottish suffragettes
British women medical doctors
1860s births
Year of birth uncertain
1923 deaths
Women's Social and Political Union